The men's pole vault at the 1978 European Athletics Championships was held in Prague, then Czechoslovakia, at Stadion Evžena Rošického on 30 August and 1 September 1978.

Medalists

Results

Final
1 September

Qualification
30 August

Participation
According to an unofficial count, 23 athletes from 13 countries participated in the event.

 (1)
 (1)
 (3)
 (1)
 (3)
 (3)
 (1)
 (1)
 (3)
 (2)
 (1)
 (2)
 (1)

References

Pole vault
Pole vault at the European Athletics Championships